La ink may refer to:
 LA ink, a design firm in Minneapolis, Minnesota, U.S.
 LA Ink, a reality show on TLC